Ruellia puri is a plant native to the cerrado vegetation of Brazil.

External links
 List of taxa in the Virtual Herbarium Of The New York Botanical Garden: Ruellia puri
  List of taxa in the Embrapa Recursos Genéticos e Biotecnologia: Ruellia puri

puri
Flora of Brazil